Garrensee is a lake in Ziethen, Kreis Herzogtum Lauenburg, Schleswig-Holstein, Germany.

Lakes of Schleswig-Holstein